The Royal Danish Academy of Fine Arts, School of Architecture (Danish: Det Kongelige Danske Kunsakademi, Arkitektskolen) or Kunstakademiets Arkitektskole is an institution of higher education in Copenhagen, Denmark under the Royal Danish Academy of Fine Arts, Schools of Architecture, Design and Conservation (Det Kongelige Danske Kunsakademi, often abbreviated as KADK), which is the oldest architecture and art school in the world, for more than 250 years.

Structure 
The School of Architecture contains four institutes, operating independently of each other. The school offers four bachelor's degree programs, each three years long, and ten master's degree programs, each two years long. The institutes also host researchers and doctoral students through three research centers.

Institutes 
 Institute of Architecture, Urbanism and Landscape (Institut for Bygningskunst, By og Landskab)
 Institute of Architecture and Culture (Institut for Bygningskunst og Kultur)
 Institute of Architecture and Technology (Institut for Bygningskunst og Teknologi)
 Institute of Architecture and Design (Institut for Bygningskunst og Design), shared with The School of Design

Bachelor degree programs 
 Architecture and Design - Whole and Part (Bygningskunst og Design: Helhed og Del)
 Architecture and Technology - Architecture's Anatomy and Fabrication (Bygningskunst og Teknologi: Arkitekturens Anatomi og Fabrikation)
 Architecture, Urbanism and Landscape - Complexity Handling in Practice (Bygningskunst, By og Landskab: Kompleksitetshåndtering i Praksis)
 Architecture and Culture - Taking Place (Bygningskunst og Kultur: Finder sted)

Master degree programs 
In the Institute of Architecture, Urbanism and Landscape:
 Urbanism and Societal Change
In the Institute of Architecture and Culture:
 Art and Architecture (Kunst og Arkitektur)
 Cultural Heritage, Transformation and Restoration (Kulturarv, Transformation og Restaurering)
 Political Architecture: Critical Sustainability
In the Institute of Architecture and Technology:
 Architecture and Extreme Environments
 CITAstudio: Computation in Architecture
 Settlement, Ecology & Tectonics (Bosætning, Økologi og Tektonik)
In the Institute of Architecture and Design:
 Spatial Design 
 Furniture, Space and Object (Møbel, Rum og Objekt)
Hosted externally in The School of Design, as a joint design and architecture education:
 Graphic Communication Design

Research centers 
 Centre for Sports and Architecture
 CINARK - Center for Industrialised Architecture (Center for Industriel Arkitektur)
 CITA - Centre for Information Technology and Architecture
The Head of Center of CITA, Professor Mette Ramsgaard Thomsen, received the Danish Council for Independent Research's EliteForsk Prize (Elite Research Prize) in 2016, becoming the first architectural researcher to receive the award.

References

External links 
 The Royal Danish Academy of Fine Arts, School of Architecture

Higher education in Copenhagen
Universities in Denmark